Prehistoric man may refer to:

Human evolution
The genus Homo
Archaic humans
Any perceivedly primitive culture
The Prehistoric Man, a 1924 British silent comedy film
Prehistoric Man, a 1957 nonfiction book by André Leroi-Gourhan

See also
Prehistorik Man, a 1995 video game
The Prehistoric Man Museum, Israel
Caveman
Prehistory
Paleolithic
Cradle of Humankind (disambiguation)